The Paul Butterfield Blues Band was an American blues rock band from Chicago, Illinois. Formed in the summer of 1963, the group originally featured eponymous vocalist and harmonicist Paul Butterfield, guitarist Elvin Bishop, bassist Jerome Arnold and drummer Sam Lay. The band was signed by Elektra Records in 1964, with one of the label's house producers, Paul A. Rothchild, convincing Butterfield to add Mike Bloomfield as a second guitarist around the same time. The group recorded its planned debut album before the end of the year, although it was scrapped and remained unavailable until it was released as The Original Lost Elektra Sessions in 1995. Shortly after performing at the Newport Folk Festival in July 1965, the band expanded to a six-piece with the addition of keyboardist Mark Naftalin, who had performed with them at the show.

With its new lineup in place, Butterfield and his band released its self-titled debut album in October 1965. Shortly after its release, however, Lay was hospitalised after contracting pleural effusion; he was replaced for one show by Billy Warren, who was then dismissed in favor of Billy Davenport, who joined in late December. The group recorded and released its second album East-West in 1966. In February 1967, Bloomfield left the Butterfield Blues Band and moved to San Francisco, California to form a new band called the Electric Flag. By the time the group performed at the Monterey Pop Festival, Arnold had been replaced by Charley "Bugsy" Maugh, and the group had expanded with the addition of saxophonists Gene Dinwiddie, David Sanborn and trumpeter Keith Johnson. Davenport retired shortly thereafter and was replaced by Phillip Wilson.

The eight-piece lineup released The Resurrection of Pigboy Crabshaw in 1967 and In My Own Dream in 1968. Bishop and Naftalin left shortly after the release of the latter, with Howard "Buzz" Feiten brought in as their replacement. Early the next year, Maugh made way for Rod Hicks and Steve Madaio joined as a second trumpeter. By the summer, the group had also added keyboardist Ted Harris and third saxophonist Trevor Lawrence. After the release of Keep On Moving, Feiten and Wilson were replaced by Ralph Wash and George Davidson, respectively, while Johnson also left. Late the following year, Harris left the band and Dennis Whitted took over from Davidson on drums. Sometimes I Just Feel Like Smilin' was released in 1971, after which the group disbanded. Butterfield died in May 1987 due to an accidental drug overdose.

Members

Timeline

Lineups

References

Butterfield, Paul Blues Band, The